The Women's National Championship is a single-elimination tournament played each year in the United States featuring women's college rugby teams from the National Small College Rugby Organization to determine the national championship. 

From 2003 to 2006, event name was "East Coast Division 3 Collegiate Championship". 

Effective August 2012, Small College Championship nomenclature replaced Division 3.

Champions

References

External links
NSCRO NATIONAL CHAMPIONSHIPS

NSCRO Championships
Women's rugby union competitions in the United States